Nils Håkansson (Latinized as Nicolaus Haquini) was a late medieval Swedish painter from  Vadstena.

Biography
Håkansson, known as Vittskövlemästaren, may have been the leader of a group of painters known as the Vittskövle group (Vittskövlemästaren).
His time in the border areas between Blekinge and Scania was limited to about ten years.
He is mostly  known for wall paintings at Vittskövle Church,  Gladsax Church  and   Ysane Church  in Scania.
Håkansson or his school  also worked at  Östra Eneby in Norrköping and at Strängnäs Cathedral. .

References

Further reading

Medieval Swedish painters
Swedish male painters
Year of death unknown
Year of birth unknown
15th-century Swedish people